Radhe Radhe may refer to:

Radhe Radhe, a Hindi expression used as a greeting and salutation
Radhe Radhe: Rites of Holi, a 2014 album by Vijay Iyer
 "Radhe Radhe", a song by Kula Shaker from the 1999 album Peasants, Pigs & Astronauts
 "Radhe Radhe", a song by Amit Gupta from the 2019 Bollywood movie Dream Girl

See also
 Radhe (disambiguation)